Sir Hamilton Edward de Coucey Howard, 2nd Baronet  (19 October 1915 – 16 March 2001), known as Sir Edward Howard, was an English aristocrat, businessman and public official who was Lord Mayor of London.

Biography

Early life
Hamilton Edward de Coucey Howard was born on 19 October 1915. His father was Sir Seymour Howard, 1st Baronet (1886–1967) and his mother, Edith Maud Turner. He attended Institut Le Rosey, a boarding school near Rolle, Switzerland, and graduated from Radley College, a boarding school in Radley, Oxfordshire, and from Worcester College, Oxford. He served in the Royal Air Force Volunteer Reserve during the Second World War.

Business career
He worked as a stockbroker at the London Stock Exchange. An entrepreneur, he purchased Eucryl, a small company from Southampton which made tooth powder and turned it into a successful company. From 1971 to 1982, he served as Chairman of the London Rubber Company, later known as SSL International. Later, he served as Senior Partner and Chairman of Charles Stanley Group, and Chairman of the Advanced Electronics Company Limited.

Public service
He served as an Alderman of the City of London. He then served as Sheriff of the City of London in 1966, and as Lord Mayor of London from 1971 to 1972. He also served as Lieutenant of the City of London from 1976 to 1990.

He became the 2nd Howard baronets of Great Rissington in 1967. He was appointed a Knight of the Most Venerable Order of the Hospital of St. John of Jerusalem (KStJ) in February 1972, and became Knight Grand Cross of the Order of the British Empire later the same year.

Personal life
He married Elizabeth Howarth Ludlow on 10 July 1943. They had two sons: 
Sir David Howarth Seymour Howard, 3rd Baronet (born 1945). 
John Ludlow Seymour Howard (born 1948).

They resided in the North Downs. He did not drink alcohol, and he enjoyed gardening. He died on 16 March 2001.

References
HOWARD, Sir (Hamilton) Edward (de Coucey), Who Was Who, A & C Black, 1920–2016 (online edition, Oxford University Press, 2014)

1915 births
2001 deaths
People educated at Radley College
Alumni of Worcester College, Oxford
Baronets in the Baronetage of the United Kingdom
Sheriffs of the City of London
20th-century lord mayors of London
20th-century English politicians
Knights Grand Cross of the Order of the British Empire
Knights of the Order of St John
Royal Air Force Volunteer Reserve personnel of World War II
20th-century English businesspeople
Alumni of Institut Le Rosey